The 2014–15 Eredivisie season was the 59th season of the Eredivisie since its establishment in 1955. On 18 April 2015, PSV were confirmed as champions of the season, thus ending the four-year reign of Ajax.

Teams 
A total of 18 teams took part in the league: The best fifteen teams from the 2013–14 season, two promotion/relegation playoff winners and the 2013–14 Eerste Divisie champions.

There are three teams that played in the 2013–14 Eerste Divisie that were promoted to the Eredivisie for the 2014–15 season. Willem II returned to the Eredivisie after just one season by winning its first Eerste Divisie title in 49 years. Meanwhile, FC Dordrecht and Excelsior navigated to the promotion/relegation playoffs to reach the Eredivisie, with both clubs having received byes after finishing second and third in the Eerste Divisie. FC Dordrecht swept both legs against VVV-Venlo 5–2 on aggregate in the second round before facing another Eerste Divisie club for a spot in the Eredivisie (after Sparta Rotterdam sent NEC Nijmegen into relegation). FC Dordrecht won 5–3 on aggregate to return to the Eredivisie for the first time in 19 years.

Excelsior returned after two seasons in the Eerste Divisie by first overcoming FC Den Bosch 5–2 on aggregate before relegating RKC Waalwijk from the league by winning 4–2 on aggregate.

Personnel and kits 

Note: Flags indicate national team as has been defined under FIFA eligibility rules. Players and Managers may hold more than one non-FIFA nationality.

Managerial changes

Standings

Results

Season statistics

Top scorers

Assists

Play-offs

European competition 
Four teams played for a spot in the 2015–16 UEFA Europa League third qualifying round.

Key: * = Play-off winners, (a) = Wins because of away goals rule, (e) = Wins after extra time in second leg, (p) = Wins after penalty shoot-out.

Promotion/relegation play-offs 
Ten teams, two from the Eredivisie and eight from the Eerste Divisie, played for two spots in the 2015–16 Eredivisie, the remaining eight teams play in the 2015–16 Eerste Divisie.

Key: * = Play-off winners, (a) = Wins because of away goals rule, (e) = Wins after extra time in second leg, (p) = Wins after penalty shoot-out.

References

External links 
 

2014-15
Neth
1